Marius Onciu  (born 23 April 1987) is a former Romanian footballer. He played for Ceahlăul Piatra Neamţ  club in Liga I in the 2009–10 season.

References

1987 births
Living people
Romanian footballers
Association football midfielders
CSM Ceahlăul Piatra Neamț players
ACS Foresta Suceava players
Liga I players
Liga II players
Sportspeople from Suceava